The Wilbur Wynant House (also known as 600 Fillmore or simply the Wynant House) was a house designed by architect Frank Lloyd Wright in Gary, Indiana, United States. During the end of the house's lifespan it was in poor condition; in the mid-2000s it was purchased by a man who planned to restore it, but it was destroyed by fire on January 9, 2006.

Fire 

On January 9, 2006, the Wynant House burned. Officials suspect arson as the cause of this unexpected fire. The remaining structure was subsequently razed and the lot was confirmed to be vacant in November 2012.

References

External links

 Chris Meyers Log
"There is Too a There There!": Dwell Magazine article from December 2000; includes a first level floor plan.

Former National Register of Historic Places in Indiana
Houses on the National Register of Historic Places in Indiana
National Register of Historic Places in Gary, Indiana
Houses completed in 1916
Frank Lloyd Wright buildings
Buildings and structures in the United States destroyed by arson
Arson in Indiana
Houses in Lake County, Indiana
Burned houses in the United States
Prairie School architecture in Indiana